The Wildlife Society Bulletin is a peer-reviewed scientific journal devoted to the ecology of non-domesticated animal species.  It is published by John Wiley & Sons on behalf of The Wildlife Society.

See also 
 Journal of Wildlife Management
 Wildlife Monographs

External links 
 

Publications established in 1973
Ecology journals
English-language journals
Quarterly journals